Break Stuff is a studio album by American jazz musician Vijay Iyer. It was released in February 2015 under ECM Records.

Reception
Thom Jurek in his review for All Music says that "This trio aims at an interior center, finds it, and pushes out, projecting Iyer & Co.'s discoveries." In The Guardian, John Fordham gave this album four stars out of five, saying, "Iyer, bassist Stephan Crump and drummer Marcus Gilmore sound joined at the hip even when sometimes seeming to be investigating completely different tunes, but almost everything here feels just as jazz-rooted as the three classic covers on the tracklist."

John Garelick of The Boston Globe stated, "Like the pianist and composer’s other trio records, it makes for a satisfying, portable Iyer, alternating math-y rhythmic concoctions like the post-minimalist “Hood” (for the Detroit techno producer DJ Robert Hood) and “Mystery Woman” (which draws from the compound rhythms of South Indian music) with varied jazz standards (Thelonious Monk's “Work,” John Coltrane's “Countdown,” Billy Strayhorn's “Blood Count”) and more atmospheric originals. Iyer, bassist Stephan Crump, and drummer Marcus Gilmore have fully incorporated electronica and hip-hop into a jazz vocabulary. Despite the album's layered meters, you couldn't ask for a more swinging “Work,” or a more moving solo-piano treatment of “Blood Count,” ending with a repetition of the questing opening phrase over somber low-register chords. With all of this band's attention to rhythm, it's nice to have an isolated example of Iyer's sensitive voice leading, his beautiful touch and tone."

Track listing
ECM Records – ECM 2420.

Personnel
Vijay Iyer – piano
Stephan Crump – bass
Marcus Gilmore – drums

References

2015 albums
Vijay Iyer albums
ECM Records albums
Albums produced by Manfred Eicher
Jazz albums by American artists